"Love Song for a Vampire" is a song composed and recorded by Scottish singer-songwriter Annie Lennox. It was recorded for Francis Ford Coppola's 1992 film, Bram Stoker's Dracula based on the 1897 gothic horror novel, where it plays during the end credits. Released in February 1993 as a double A-side with "Little Bird" in Ireland, the United Kingdom and several other countries in Europe, the single was a hit, peaking at number three on the UK and Irish Singles Charts. "Love Song for a Vampire" by itself reached number four in Spain and number 10 in France.

Critical reception
In their review of the soundtrack for Bram Stoker's Dracula, Billboard wrote, "The highlight and probable single is the only vocal entry on the album, Annie Lennox's haunting, romantic 'Love Song for a Vampire'." Mike Ragogna from HuffPost noted that in the song, "Lennox sings the poem, 'Once I had the rarest rose that ever deigned to bloom, cruel winter chilled the bud and stole my flower too soon', slyly transporting us from Bram Stoker's world to that of Anne Rice's without our realizing." In his weekly UK chart commentary, James Masterton declared it as a "gorgeous contribution" to the movie. Alan Jones from Music Week named it Pick of the Week, describing it as "a simple, mournful, relentless and (appropriately?) haunting song."

Music video
The accompanying music video for "Love Song for a Vampire" was directed by British director Sophie Muller. It features Annie Lennox, seen in a dark garden very similar to Lucy Westenra's in the film, and wearing a similar white dress. As she sings, several excerpts from the film are shown, and the video ends as what appears to be holy light shines upon her, very similar to what happens during Dracula's death at the film's end. David Sinclair from Rolling Stone complimented it as an "extraordinary video", and "a striking display of sinister melancholia by Lennox intercut with a tour de force of special culled from the movie."

Release
In the UK, the song was the bigger hit of the double-A sided single with Lennox's track "Little Bird" from her album Diva. It reached number three on the UK Singles Chart in early 1993, while in the US, it reached number 24 on the Billboard Modern Rock Tracks chart.

It reappeared in 1995 on the UK CD single "A Whiter Shade of Pale", alongside Lennox's covers of the Psychedelic Furs' "Heaven" and Blondie's "(I'm Always Touched by Your) Presence, Dear".

Track listings
All tracks were written by Annie Lennox unless otherwise noted.

CD: Arista / 07822 12522 2 (US)

 The final three tracks were recorded live for MTV Unplugged at the Montreux Jazz Festival in Montreux, Switzerland, 3 July 1992.

CD: BMG / 74321 13383 2 (UK)

Charts and certifications

Weekly charts

Year-end charts

Certifications

References

1990s ballads
1992 songs
1993 singles
Annie Lennox songs
Arista Records singles
Columbia Records singles
Music videos directed by Sophie Muller
Pop ballads
Song recordings produced by Stephen Lipson
Songs about vampires
Songs written by Annie Lennox
Songs written for films
Dracula